Burrs or burs  (sometimes called rotary files) are small cutting tools; not to be confused with small pieces of metal formed from cutting metal, used in die grinders, rotary tools, or dental drills. The name may be considered appropriate when their small-sized head (3 mm diameter shaft) is compared to a bur (fruit seed with hooks) or their teeth are compared to a metal burr.

Description
Burrs are a rotary analog to files that cut linearly (hence their alternate name, rotary files). They are also in many ways comparable to endmills and  router bits; a distinction is that the latter usually have their toolpath controlled by the machine, whereas burrs are often used freehand. However, there is substantial overlap in the use and toolpath control of these various classes of cutters,  and e outcomes accomplished with them. For example, endmills can be used in routers, and burrs can be used like endmills in milling by CNC or manual machine tools. These are often used in CNC machining centers for removing burrs (the small flakes of metal) after a machining process.

Burrs are spun quickly to maintain the ideal surface speed and cutting conditions (thousands or tens of thousands of RPM; often the top speed available on a given spindle). Because they are constructed of tungsten carbide, the cutters in the image can operate at higher speeds than comparable "HSS" cutters while still maintaining their cutting edges.

Because the cutting edges of burrs are so small, they can often be touched when spinning by a finger without cutting the skin, which flexes out of the way, although it would not be safe to pinch or grip them from two sides. Hard metal or ceramic workpieces cannot flex beyond the cutting edges, so the tools remove material from them. This characteristic makes burrs suitable for degrind the teeth' hard enamel, yet leaves soft mouth tissues unharmed if the tool unintentionally touches as the tool will grind the hard enamel of teeth, yet leaves soft mouth tissues unharmed if the tool should unintentionally touch them.

References 

Metalworking cutting tools